The Tara Theatre was an art house movie theater located in Atlanta. The theater specialized in the showing of independent films, the only theater in Atlanta to do so exclusively.

History
The Tara Theatre was opened in June 1968 by Loew's Theatres. It embodied the modernist architecture popular at the time. Originally called Loew's Tara, the theater's name memorialized the fictional Tara plantation, home of the O'Hara family in Margaret Mitchell's novel Gone with the Wind. Tara opened with a 70mm, stereophonic presentation of the film Gone with the Wind on its 60-foot screen. This single screen with seating for 1,200 was later twinned. In the 1970s, one of the twin theaters was twinned itself, and a separate fourth theater was added onto the building. The theater became part of the local Lefont theater group in the 1980s. At the end of that decade, United Artists Theaters bought the Tara and used part of the building as a regional corporate office until United Artists, along with Edwards Theatres, was merged into the new parent company Regal Entertainment Group in 2002, but is still operated under the United Artists label. Shortly afterward, the Tara was remodeled to feature silver, streamline moderne-inspired details in the interior and above the portico, faux art deco advertisements, and large hanging portraits of classical Hollywood movie stars, such as Greta Garbo, Humphrey Bogart, Ingrid Bergman, and Charlie Chaplin.

The Tara was closed by Regal in November 2022.

References

Theatres in Atlanta
Cinemas and movie theaters in Georgia (U.S. state)
Landmarks in Atlanta
Modernist architecture in Georgia (U.S. state)
1968 establishments in Georgia (U.S. state)
Loew's Theatres buildings and structures
Theatres completed in 1968